Madeleine Kay Alessandri  (born 1965) is a British civil servant who has had a career in the security and diplomatic services. , she is the Permanent Secretary for the Northern Ireland Office, replacing Sir Jonathan Stephens following his retirement.

Alessandri studied Economics with International Relations at the University of St. Andrews, and then joined government service in 1988. After a number of roles in overseas national security and diplomatic service, including serving as Political Counsellor at the British Embassy in Japan from 2004–2007, following Colin Roberts, Alessandri ultimately became a director in the Foreign and Commonwealth Office. Alessandri was appointed a Companion of the Order of St Michael and St George (CMG) in the Queen's Birthday Honours in June 2017 for her "services to British foreign policy", whilst serving as a director at the Foreign and Commonwealth Office.

From July 2018 until early 2020, Alessandri transferred to the Cabinet Office, where she served as one of the UK's Deputy National Security Advisers alongside David Quarrey, supporting the prime minister on national resilience and security. She also serves as National Honorary Chair of the Civil Service Retirement Fellowship since January 2020.

Offices held

References

External links 
 Alessandri's page on gov.uk

Living people
1965 births
British civil servants
Alumni of the University of St Andrews
Members of HM Diplomatic Service
Companions of the Order of St Michael and St George
Permanent Under-Secretaries of State for Northern Ireland